Ronald Justin Hudson (July 14, 1911 — October 11, 1984) was a Canadian professional ice hockey player

Career 
Hudson played 33 games in the National Hockey League with the Detroit Red Wings between 1937 and 1940. The rest of his career, which lasted from 1931 to 1945, was spent in various minor leagues. Hudson was born in Calgary, Alberta.

Career statistics

Regular season and playoffs

References

External links
  

1911 births
1984 deaths
Canadian expatriate ice hockey players in the United States
Canadian ice hockey right wingers
Detroit Olympics (IHL) players
Detroit Red Wings players
Indianapolis Capitals players
Omaha Knights (AHA) players
Pittsburgh Hornets players
Providence Reds players
St. Louis Flyers players
Ice hockey people from Calgary